Mehmet Tevfik Gerçeker (born Mehmed Tawfiq; 1898 – 28 January 1982) was a Turkish scholar.

Biography
In his hometown, he studied religion and astronomy for his education. After this period, he moved to Istanbul where he completed higher education in a Madrasah. He was a founding member of the Turkish Directorate of Religious Affairs, and served at a high position in that department. He then served as Deputy Head of the Council of State from 1952 until his retirement in 1963. He was appointed President of the Directorate of Religious Affairs in 1964.

References

1898 births
1982 deaths